Bhatkudgaon is a village of Shevgaon Taluka in the Ahmednagar district in the state of Maharashtra, India.

Bhatkudgaon has a population of more than 11,000. There are many castes living in this village, many temples, clean and beautiful village. Surnames include Aher, Phatangare, Kale, Wani, Dagade, Jadhav, Manal, Shirsath, Jamdhade, Najan, Shinde, Vadane, Bhendekar, Salve. Tal Shevgaon to distance Of village are 13 km, & Village near Bhatkudgaon Telkudgaon are 7.8 km, Kukana are  10.4 km, Jeur are 6.4 km. 

The villages has many temples, including Maruti Mandir, Vitthal Mandir, Datta Mandir, Kaleshwar Mandir(Gumpha)and Lord Shiva (Mahadev). Its population is approximately 10,000. Most people live on their farms.

The village's pincode is 414502, and the postal head office is at Shevgaon.

Nearby populated villages include Jamdhade wasti, Vadane Patil Vasti, Dalvi Vasti, Najan Wasti, Wani Vasti, Dagade Vasti, Shinde Wasti and Gumpha.

Villages in Ahmednagar district